David or Dave Donaldson may refer to:

 Dave Donaldson (Australian footballer) (born 1933), Australian rules footballer
 Dave Donaldson (economist) (born 1978), Canadian economist, winner of John Bates Clark Medal
 Dave Donaldson (footballer, born 1911) (1911–1974), English football player with Grimsby Town and York City
 Dave Donaldson (footballer, born 1941), English football player with Wimbledon
 Dave Donaldson (footballer, born 1954), English football player with Millwall and Cambridge United
 David Donaldson (artist) (1916–1996), Scottish artist, Painter and Limner to Her Majesty the Queen
 David Donaldson (composer) (born 1960), New Zealand composer and performer